This is a list of members of the Western Australian Legislative Assembly from 2005 to 2008:

Notes
 On 16 January 2006, the Labor member for Victoria Park and Premier, Geoff Gallop, resigned due to recently diagnosed depression. Labor candidate Ben Wyatt was elected to replace him at the by-election for Victoria Park on 11 March 2006.
 On 25 August 2006, the Labor member for Ballajura and former Minister for Police, John D'Orazio, was expelled from the Labor Party after being involved in a series of public controversies. He continued to sit in parliament as an independent. On 18 April 2008, he was readmitted to the Labor Party after being cleared of corruption allegations, but resigned again on 26 June 2008.
 On 27 February 2006, the Labor member for Murchison-Eyre, John Bowler, was sacked as Minister for Resources and expelled from the Labor Party after he was discovered to have leaked confidential Cabinet information to disgraced lobbyists Julian Grill and Brian Burke. He served out the remainder of his term as an independent, and won the seat of Kalgoorlie at the 2008 election.
 On 10 November 2006, the Labor member for Peel, Norm Marlborough, resigned after being sacked from Cabinet for lying to the Corruption and Crime Commission about his dealings with disgraced former Premier Brian Burke. Labor candidate Paul Papalia was elected to replace him at the by-election for Peel on 3 February 2007.
 On 17 January 2008, the Liberal member for Murdoch, Trevor Sprigg, died of a heart attack. Liberal candidate Christian Porter was elected to replace him at the by-election for Murdoch on 23 February 2008.
 On 7 February 2008, the Liberal member for Nedlands and former Shadow Attorney-General, Sue Walker, left the Liberal Party after Troy Buswell became the party leader. She served out the remainder of her term as an independent, but failed to retain her seat at the 2008 election.
 On 23 February 2008, the Liberal member for Leschenault, former deputy Liberal leader Dan Sullivan, left the party. He continued to sit in parliament as an independent, and on 20 June 2008, launched and became the inaugural leader of the WAFamilyFirst.com Party, the state branch of the Family First Party. He failed to retain his seat at the 2008 election.
 On 19 May 2008, the Labor member for Yokine and former Assistant Police Commissioner, Bob Kucera, left the Labor Party after it confirmed he was ineligible to contest preselection under party rules. He served out the remainder of his term as an independent and did not contest the 2008 election.
 On 19 June 2008, the Liberal member for Warren-Blackwood and former Opposition Leader, Paul Omodei, left the Liberal Party. He served out the remainder of his term as an independent and did not contest the 2008 election.

See also
 2005 Western Australian state election

Members of Western Australian parliaments by term